The Chale Wote Street Art Festival  also known as Chale Wote is an alternative platform that brings art, music, dance and performance out into the streets. The festival targets exchanges between scores of local and international artists and patrons by creating and appreciating art together.

Since 2011, CHALE WOTE has included street painting, graffiti murals, photography, theater, spoken word, interactive art installations, live street performances, extreme sports, film shows, a fashion parade, a music block party, recyclable design workshops and much more. It is the first to be organized in Accra, Ghana and has inspired similar events across the country. There have been 6 editions so far; the first two ran for one day each, while the 2013 and 2014 edition ran concurrently for two days, the former in September and the latter in August, a week after the Homowo festival of the Ga people at the historical Jamestown, Ghana on the High Street in Accra. The format switched in 2016 when the festival lasted an entire week, from August 18–21. This switch saw the festival hop from the open street gallery that is Jamestown to other art spaces, such as the Nubuke Foundation, the Museum of Science and Technology as well as film screenings at the Movenpick Ambassador Hotel. The same format will be replicated in the 7th edition, themed, Wata Mata with further immersion into Accra, spreading to areas such as Nima, Osu and more. The event is produced by Accra [dot] Alt Radio,  with support from  other local cultural networks like Attukwei Art Foundation, Foundation for Contemporary Art Ghana, Dr. Monk, Redd Kat Pictures and the Institut français in Ghana.

Activities 
List of activities during the street festival.
 Photo Exhibitions
 Street Painting
 Graffiti Murals
 Interactive Installations
 Street Boxing
 Movie Screening
 Procession of Cultures
 Design Labs
 Movie Screenings

Editions

Gallery

References

 MegaMind Concept Gh. / Chalewote Article

External links
(2014)
(2014)
CHALE WOTE FESTIVAL KEEPS GETTING BETTER (2013)
WHAT I SAW AT THE CHALE WOTE STREET FESTIVAL IN JAMES TOWN (2011)

Street art festivals
Arts festivals in Ghana